Vyshhorod is a city in Kyiv Oblast (region) in central Ukraine, situated immediately north of Kyiv city, the national capital, and part of the Kyiv metropolitan area. It is on the right (western) bank of the Dnieper river and, as the location of the Kyiv Hydroelectric Power Plant, the northern part of the city is beside the Kyiv Reservoir. It is the administrative center of Vyshhorod Raion and hosts the administration of Vyshhorod urban hromada, one of the hromadas of Ukraine.

With a history dating back to the first millennium, Vyshhorod is now a notable industrial center and a growing commuter town for Kyiv. Its population is approximately

Geography and climate
Vyshhorod is located on a hilly right bank of the Dnieper river adjoining the dam of the Kyiv Reservoir.

History

The earliest historical mention of Vyshhorod (the name translates as "the town upstream") dates from as early as 946 when it was described as the favourite residence of Saint Olga. Also mentioned in De Administrando Imperio, Vyshhorod served as the fortified castle and residence of the monarchs of Kievan Rus' on the Dnieper from that time until 1240, when the Mongols sacked it. At Vyshhorod Vladimir the Great (reigned 980 to 1015) kept a harem of 300 concubines. After the Mongol invasion, the location does not appear in the records again until 1523 – and even then it was documented as a poor village.

In 1934-37 and 1947, the archaeological remnants of the medieval town were excavated. The most striking find was the basement of the eight-pillared Church of St. Basil, founded by Vladimir the Great and named after his patron saint.  As the church was one of the largest in Kievan Rus', it took twenty years to complete it. Before the Mongol invasion, the church housed the relics of the first East Slavic saints, Boris and Gleb, but their subsequent fate remains a mystery. The ancient Cossack military monastery, the Mezhyhirskyi Monastery, stood not too far away from the city.

Vyshhorod grew considerably following the construction of the hydroelectric Kyiv power plant and was incorporated as a town in 1968.

Industry 
Vyshhorod has more than 1,500 enterprises and companies, the most important being the Kyiv Hydroelectric Power Plant, the Kyiv Pumped Storage Power Plant (both operated by Ukrhydroenergo) and a building materials factory owned by German firm Henkel.

Transportation
Vyshhorod is connected to Kyiv and other localities mainly by roads. There is also a non-electrified terminus rail connection to Kyiv used for both freight transport and peak hour commuter passenger service. The city's river port facilities are used for local industrial purposes only. Jitney buses run between Vyshhorod and the Heroiv Dnipra station of the Kyiv Metro's Obolonsko–Teremkivska line.

Sports 
In 2011, Vyshhorod was the first Ukrainian city to host the F1 Powerboat World Championship motorboat race.

Twin towns – sister cities

Vyshhorod is twinned with:

 Delčevo, North Macedonia
 Eichenau, Germany
 Kaniv, Ukraine
 Lörrach, Germany
 Rakvere, Estonia
 Sens, France
 Wyszków, Poland

See also 
 Visegrad, towns with similar names

References

External links 

 Unofficial page
 Vyshhorod photo gallery

Cities in Kyiv Oblast
History of Kievan Rus'
946 establishments
Cities of district significance in Ukraine
Populated places on the Dnieper in Ukraine